Huang Jue (born 7 August 1974) is a Chinese actor. He gained fame for his roles in Baobei in Love (2004), Falling Flowers (2012), and Fallen City (2013). In 2018, Jue has also starred in the films Long Day's Journey into Night, which was screened in the Un Certain Regard section at the 2018 Cannes Film Festival.

Filmography

Film

Television series

Awards and nominations

References

External links

1974 births
Living people
Male actors from Guangxi
21st-century Chinese male actors
Chinese male television actors
Chinese male film actors